Kingston Crossing Halt railway station was a halt on the Watlington and Princes Risborough Railway which the Great Western Railway opened in 1906 to serve the Oxfordshire village of Kingston Blount. The opening of the halt was part of a GWR attempt to encourage more passengers on the line at a time when competition from bus services was drawing away custom.

History
The halt was one of three that the GWR opened on the line in September 1906 to try to encourage passenger traffic in the face of increased competition from buses. It was southeast of Kingston Blount on the northeastern side of the level crossing on Kingston Hill. The crossing keeper closed the gates across the road before the arrival of each train, with the exception of the early morning and late night goods services, when the guard was responsible. The station had basic facilities: a single low platform on which stood a wooden passenger waiting shelter and the running in board. Up to twelve passengers were known to have caught the early morning services in the 1940s. In the long term the GWR's halt strategy did little to dissuade people from more convenient bus services. In 1957 British Railways closed the halt and withdrew passenger services from the line.

Present day

The cottage at the halt remains intact. One can see in the garden of the cottage small line side buildings and huts that can be identified in photographs taken when the line was still in operation. The Upper Icknield Way runs parallel to the former railway alignment to the east for several hundred yards.

The Heritage Chinnor and Princes Risborough Railway aims to hopefully extend their own running line through this former site to Aston Rowant, (Although this may not include reinstating this crossing site, as it could never be alighted, as was the same as two other halt sites down the line towards Thame Junction).

References

Sources

External links 
 Station on navigable 1946 O.S. map
 Image of the station in 1957

Disused railway stations in Oxfordshire
Former Great Western Railway stations
Railway stations in Great Britain opened in 1906
Railway stations in Great Britain closed in 1957